Anne Thornton (born June 16, 1981) is an American pastry chef and food writer who came to prominence as the host of the Food Network television series Dessert First with Anne Thornton.

Early life and education
Thornton was born in San Antonio, Texas but raised in Cleveland, Ohio. She graduated from Magnificat High School (in Rocky River, Ohio) in 1999. Thornton attended Miami University in Oxford, Ohio and obtained degrees in philosophy and finance. She then moved to New York City and enrolled in the Institute of Culinary Education, where she obtained a degree in culinary arts.

Career

Thornton gained the attention of Food Network after she presented her salted caramel banana pudding pie at the 2009 New York Wine & Food Festival. Her own cooking show was then developed, Dessert First with Anne Thornton, which aired from 2010 to 2011.

Controversy
After the conclusion of Dessert First with Anne Thornton, news outlets reported that several of Thornton's recipes had been plagiarized from other chefs, with many recipes purportedly stolen from Martha Stewart and fellow Food Network chef Ina Garten. In an interview with Today on February 16, 2012, Thornton addressed the allegations by stating: "I get inspiration from all my heroes [...] of course there will be similarities."

References

External links
 
 

1981 births
American food writers
American television chefs
Food Network chefs
Institute of Culinary Education alumni
Living people
Miami University alumni
Pastry chefs
People from San Antonio
American women chefs
21st-century American women